Kumlupınar is a village in the Kozluk District, Batman Province, Turkey. Its population is 437 (2021).

The hamlets of Kocabey and Toptaşı are attached to the village.

References

Villages in Kozluk District

Kurdish settlements in Batman Province